Radio Nacional de Venezuela is a government radio station in Venezuela.
Broadcasting began in 1936. The station is currently run by the Venezuelan governments Ministry of Popular Power for Communication and Information (MINCI).

For external broadcasting there is a shortwave station south-east of Calabozo replacing a mediumwave station on Paraguaná Peninsula.

References

Station web site in Spanish (2018)
English language news stories (2018)

Radio stations established in 1936
Radio stations in Venezuela
1936 establishments in Venezuela
Bolivarian Communication and Information System